In organosulfur chemistry, a Bunte salt is an archaic name for salts with the formula RSSO3–Na+.  They are also called S-alkylthiosulfates or S-arylthiosulfates.  These compounds are typically derived from alkylation on the pendant sulfur of sodium thiosulfate:
RX  +  Na2S2O3   →  Na[O3S2R]  +  NaX
They have been used as intermediates in the synthesis of thiols.  They are also used to generate unsymmetrical disulfides:
Na[O3S2R]  +  NaSR'   →   RSSR'  +  Na2SO3

According to X-ray crystallography, they adopt the expected structure with tetrahedral sulfur(VI) atom, a sulfur-sulfur single bond, and three equivalent sulfur-oxygen bonds.

See also
Thiosulfonates are organosulfur compounds with the formula RSO2S− and RSO2SR'

References

Organosulfur compounds